Melissa Lafsky (born 1979) is an American writer and entrepreneur. She began her career as a writer by founding the Opinionistas blog, which focused on the dehumanizing aspects of working at large law firms. She then entered digital journalism, writing for media brands like the Huffington Post and launching sites for Newsweek and the New York Times.

Education and legal career
Lafsky graduated from National Cathedral School in Washington D.C., and then Dartmouth College in 2000. She then received her J.D. from The University of Virginia School of Law. She began writing Opinionistas anonymously while working as a junior associate at a law firm in New York City.  After her blog was discovered by Gawker in April 2005, it gained a profile and was covered by The New York Times. She then resigned her law firm position in December 2005 to pursue a career in writing, and revealed her identity to the New York Observer in January 2006.

Writing & Editorial career
Lafsky has written for publications including The New York Times, the New York Post, Wired, the New York Observer and The Christian Science Monitor. She spent a year as a contributor and then associate editor at The Huffington Post, where she wrote reported pieces, editorials and media commentary. In May 2007, she was hired as editor of the Freakonomics blog, which features content by the authors of the internationally best-selling book. Freakonomics.com then became part of The New York Times Online. In March 2008 she left The Times to become the Web editor at Discover magazine, where she wrote features and founded the science and politics blog Reality Base.  

In August 2009, following the death of Ted Kennedy, she wrote a controversial article about the Chappaquiddick incident, in which she speculated that the victim of that incident, Mary Jo Kopechne, might have felt that the injustice of Kennedy's not facing jail time was "worth it" because it spurred Kennedy's later social justice work. The comment was attacked by the conservative media. Rush Limbaugh said on his show that it meant that "liberal young women like to die for the cause of advancing Kennedys’ careers." Lafsky responded by criticizing the right wing media for using out-of-context soundbites to stir up controversy.

In 2011, she was hired to launch Newsweeks iPad edition.  It launched in January 2012 to positive reviews. 

Lafsky also wrote the popular "Horror Chick" column for The Awl about the cultural impact of horror movies.

In 2016 she began working with Silicon Valley companies. She worked with Facebook to launch the first Facebook Communities Summit in June 2017, in which Mark Zuckerberg announced that the company was changing its mission.  She also helped launch the first Facebook Social Good Forum in which Facebook highlighted its social impact work.  She then turned to cryptocurrency, writing a popular post for Medium about women in crypto.

References

External links
Opinionistas
Lafsky's articles for Freakonomics/NYT
January 18, 2006, New York Observer article, which revealed Lafsky's identity
November 6, 2005, New York Times article, which profiled Lafsky's blog
September 22, 2005, Harvard Law Record article, which profiled Lafsky's blog

1978 births
American bloggers
Living people
Dartmouth College alumni
University of Virginia School of Law alumni
National Cathedral School alumni